Searching for Sugar Man is a 2012 documentary film about a South African cultural phenomenon, written and directed by Malik Bendjelloul, which details the efforts in the late 1990s of two Cape Town fans, Stephen "Sugar" Segerman and Craig Bartholomew Strydom, to find out whether the rumoured death of American musician Sixto Rodriguez was true and, if not, to discover what had become of him. Rodriguez's music, which had never achieved success in the United States, had become very popular in South Africa, although little was known about him in that country.

On 10 February 2013, the film won the BAFTA Award for Best Documentary at the 66th British Academy Film Awards in London and two weeks later, it won the Academy Award for Best Documentary Feature at the 85th Academy Awards in Hollywood.

Production

Initially using Super 8 film to record stylised shots for the film, director Malik Bendjelloul ran out of money for more film to record the final few shots. After three years of cutting-room work the main financial backers of the film threatened to withdraw funding to finish it. He resorted to filming the remaining stylised shots on his smartphone using an iPhone app called 8mm Vintage Camera.

Release
Searching for Sugar Man was the opening film at the Sundance Film Festival in January 2012, where it won the Special Jury Prize and the Audience Award for best international documentary. It was released in the United Kingdom on 26 July 2012, and had a limited release (New York and Los Angeles) in the United States the following day.

Searching for Sugar Man performed well during its theatrical release, earning $3,696,196 at the US box office (47th of all US docs on Box Office Mojo).

Reception

Critical response
Searching for Sugar Man has received widespread critical acclaim. The film holds a 95% rating on the review aggregator website Rotten Tomatoes with an average rating of 8/10, based on reviews from 133 critics. The site's critical consensus reads, "A fascinating portrait of a forgotten musical pioneer, Searching for Sugar Man is by turns informative and mysterious." On Metacritic, the film has a weighted average score of 79 out of 100 based on 32 critics, indicating "generally favorable reviews".

Roger Ebert of the Chicago Sun-Times gave the film a glowing four-star review, writing "I hope you're able to see this film...and yes, it exists because we need for it to."  The New York Times critic Manohla Dargis also wrote a positive review, calling the film "a hugely appealing documentary about fans, faith and an enigmatic Age of Aquarius musician who burned bright and hopeful before disappearing." Dargis subsequently named Searching for Sugar Man one of the 10 best films of 2012.

Criticism
The film's narrative of a South African story about an American musician omits that Rodriguez was successful in Australia in the 1970s and toured there in 1979 and 1981. Because of this omission some critics have called the documentary "myth-making". However, the film focuses on his mysterious reputation in South Africa and the attempts of music historians there to track him down in the mid-1990s. South Africans were unaware of his Australian success due to the harsh censorship enacted by the apartheid regime coupled with international sanctions that made any communication with the outside world on the subject of banned artists virtually impossible.

Awards and nominations
 Searching for Sugar Man won the Best Documentary category at the 85th Academy Awards. Rodriguez declined to attend the award ceremony as he did not want to overshadow the filmmakers' achievement if he came up on stage with them. Upon accepting his award, producer Simon Chinn remarked on such generosity, "That just about says everything about that man and his story that you want to know." However, Malik Bendjelloul also said on stage, "Thanks to one of the greatest singers ever, Rodriguez."
 The film also won the Best Documentary category at the 66th British Academy Film Awards on 10 February 2013.
 The Directors Guild of America awarded the DGA Award for best documentary on 2 February 2013.
 The Writers Guild of America awarded the WGA Award for best documentary.
 The Producers Guild of America awarded the PGA Award for best documentary.
 The American Cinema Editors awarded the ACE Eddie Award for best documentary.
 It won the Guldbagge Award for Best Documentary at the 48th Guldbagge Awards.
 It won The National Board of Review in New York on 5 December 2012.
 The International Documentary Association (IDA) awarded Searching for Sugar Man Best Feature and Best Music at the 28th Annual IDA Documentary Awards on 7 December 2012 at the Directors Guild of America building, Los Angeles, California.
 It also won Best Documentary during Critics' Choice Awards – Searching for Sugar Man
 Searching for Sugar Man won the Special Jury Prize and the Audience Award for best international documentary at the Sundance Film Festival. The film also won the Audience Award at the Los Angeles Film Festival, the Audience Award at the Durban International Film Festival, the Audience Award at the Melbourne Film Festival, 2nd place Winner Audience Award at the Tribeca Film Festival and the Grand Jury Prize at the Moscow International Film Festival.
 At the International Documentary Film Festival Amsterdam held in November 2012, Searching for Sugar Man won both the Audience and the Best Music Documentary awards.
 Doha Tribeca Film Festival (DTFF) Searching for Sugar Man was awarded $50,000 (US) where the film shared the "Best of the Fest" audience award with the Chinese feature film Full Circle.
 Best Film (The Audience Award) at Vilnius International Film Festival
 Best Film—In-Edit Festival in Santiago de Chile
 The Cinema Eye Honors for Nonfiction Filmmaking has nominated Searching for Sugar Man for five awards, tying with The Imposter for the most nominations. Winners of the 6th Annual Cinema Eye Honors will be announced on 9 January 2013 as Cinema Eye returns for a third year to New York City's Museum of the Moving Image in Astoria, Queens, New York.
 Nonfiction Feature Filmmaking—Malik Bendjelloul and Simon Chinn
 Production—Simon Chinn
 Graphic Design and Animation—Oskar Gullstrand, Arvid Steen
 Debut Feature Film—Malik Bendjelloul
 Audience Choice Prize—Malik Bendjelloul

The film was also the recipient of the Australian Film Critics Association award for Best Documentary of 2012, beating locally produced musical documentary All the Way Through Evening.

Soundtrack

Searching for Sugar Man is a 2012 soundtrack album from the documentary containing a compilation of songs by Rodriguez from his two studio albums. It reached No. 3 in Sweden in early 2013 when the Academy Award nomination was announced, and had been in the charts for 26 weeks by the time it received the award in February 2013. In Denmark it reached No. 18 and in New Zealand it reached No. 24.

References

External links
 
 
 
 
 
 
 Article by Craig Bartholomew in Johannesburg's Mail & Guardian, 20 February 1998: Fact: Rodriguez lives
 

2012 documentary films
2012 films
2010s British films
2010s English-language films
2010s Swedish films
Best Documentary Feature Academy Award winners
Best Documentary Feature Guldbagge Award winners
British documentary films
Culture of Detroit
Documentary films about rock music and musicians
South African culture
Sundance Film Festival award winners
Swedish documentary films